Kalinovka is a rural locality (a village) in Sukkulovsky Selsoviet, Yermekeyevsky District, Bashkortostan, Russia. The population was 67 as of 2010. There is 1 street.

Geography 
Kalinovka is located 20 km northeast of Yermekeyevo (the district's administrative centre) by road. Yelan-Chishma is the nearest rural locality.

References 

Rural localities in Yermekeyevsky District